Levine (French transliteration from Russian) / Levin (English transliteration from Russian Левин) is a common Jewish (Ashkenazi Jewish) surname. Levinsky is a variation with the same meaning (see French version of the article for a full explanation).

People with the name Levine or LeVine include:

People

In arts and media

In film, television, and theatre
Alice Levine, British television and radio presenter
Chloe Levine, American actress
Floyd Levine, American film and television actor
Joseph E. Levine, American film producer
Kate Levine, voice actor
Ken Levine (TV personality), American television and film writer and baseball announcer
Kristine Levine, American actress and stand-up comedian
Naomi Levine, American actor
Rhoda Levine, American opera director and choreographer
Samm Levine (b. 1982), American television and film actor
Ted Levine (b. 1957), American actor

In literature and journalism
Allan Levine (born 1956), Canadian writer
David Levine (1926–2009), American artist and illustrator
David D. Levine (born 1961), American science fiction writer
Gail Carson Levine (born 1947), American author of young adult books
Irving R. Levine (1922–2009), American journalist
Jeffrey Levine (poet), American poet, publisher, musician, and attorney
Judith Levine (born 1952), American political writer and civil libertarian
Ketzel Levine, American radio journalist
Mark Levine (journalist) (born 1966), delegate in the Virginia State House of Delegates and American liberal radio host
Mark Levine (poet) (born 1965), American poet
Noah Levine, writer; son of author Stephen Levine
Norman Levine (1923-2005), Canadian short story writer
Paul Levine (b.1948), American novelist and lawyer
Philip Levine (poet) (1928–2015), American populist poet, professor of English and Poet Laureate of the United States
Stephen Levine (author)  (1937–2016), American poet and author

In music
Adam Levine (born 1979), American singer, songwriter, multi-instrumentalist, actor, and television personality
Baruch Levine (born 1977), American Orthodox Jewish singer-composer
Elliot Levine, (born 1963), American jazz pianist
Gilbert Levine (born 1948), American conductor
Ian Levine (born 1953), British songwriter, producer, and DJ
James Levine (1943–2021), American orchestral conductor and pianist
James S. Levine, American composer
Jeffrey Levine (poet), American poet, publisher, musician, and attorney
Joey Levine, American songwriter, music producer and performer
Mark Levine (musician) (1938–2022), American jazz musician
Mark LeVine, American history professor and musician
Michael A. Levine, Los Angeles-based composer
Mike Levine (musician), Canadian bassist and keyboardist
Ryan Levine (musician) American musician, lead singer of band Wildling
Stewart Levine, American record producer

In other media
David Levine (photographer) (born 1960), British photographer
Esther Levine (born 1970), German-born, New York-based photographer
Herbert Levine, American fashion designer
Jack Levine (1915–2010), American expressionist painter
Janet Levine, (1963–1996) American illustrator and murder victim
Ken Levine (video game designer), American computer game designer
Marilyn Levine (1935–2005), Canadian ceramics artist
Philip Levine (entrepreneur), British entrepreneur, trendsetter and artist
Sherrie Levine (b. 1947), American photographer

In business
David Levine (executive), Canadian music and television executive
Dennis Levine (born 1953), American stock trader sentenced for perjury and securities fraud
Earl Levine, American computer businessman
Leon Levine (born 1938), American retailer
Marne Levine (born 1971/72), American businesswoman
Philip Levine (entrepreneur), British entrepreneur, trendsetter and artist
Randy Levine, American president of New York Yankees

In government, law, and politics
Adam Levine (press aide), former Bush administration aide
Beryl J. Levine (1935-202), American judge
Daniella Levine Cava (born 1955), American lawyer, social worker and politician, served Mayor of Miami-Dade County since 2020
David Levine (politician) (1883–1972), Seattle, Washington politician
Eugen Leviné (1883–1919), revolutionary leader of the Bavarian Soviet Republic
J. Sidney Levine (died 1955), New York politician
Jeffrey D. Levine, United States Ambassador to Estonia
Judith Levine (born 1952), American political writer and civil libertarian
Mark Levine (journalist) (born 1966), delegate in the Virginia State House of Delegates and American liberal radio host
Mark D. Levine (born 1969), New York City councilmember
Max S. Levine (1881–1933), American lawyer, politician, and judge
Michael E. Levine, American lawyer
Paul Levine (born 1948), American novelist and lawyer
Philip Levine (politician), mayor of Miami Beach, Florida

In science and academia

In biology, medicine, and psychology
Arnold J. Levine (b. 1939), American virologist and molecular biologist
Bruce E. Levine, American psychologist
David F. Levine (b. 1965), American author, professor, and biomedical scientist
Lena ("Lee") Levine (1903-1965), American psychiatrist and gynecologist
Peter G. Levine, (b. 1960) American stroke researcher and educator
Philip Levine (physician) (1900–1987), Russian-born American immuno-hematologist; researched blood groups
Rachel Levine (b. 1957) American pediatrician, served as Pennsylvania Secretary of Health since 2017
Robert V. Levine (1945–2019), American psychologist
Samuel A. Levine (1891–1966), American cardiologist
Stephen B. Levine (b. 1942), American psychiatrist

In other academic fields
Amy-Jill Levine, New Testament scholar
David K. Levine (born c.1955), American economist and game theorist
Dov Levine (born 1958), American-Israeli physicist
Ira N. Levine (1937-2015), American chemistry professor, Brooklyn College
Jerome Paul Levine (1937–2006), American mathematician
Joel S. Levine (born 1942), American planetary and atmospheric scientist
John R. Levine, American internet consultant
Joseph Levine (philosopher), American philosopher
Marc Levine, American mathematician
Mark LeVine, American history professor and musician
Phillip Levine (b. 1963), American economist
Raphael David Levine (b. 1938), Israeli chemist
Robert M. Levine (1941-2003), American historian
Ross Levine (b. 1960), American economist
Suzanne Jill Levine, American translator and academic

In sport
Al Levine, American major league baseball relief pitcher
Artie Levine, American middleweight and light heavyweight boxer
Darren Levine, American martial artist
David Levine (racing driver) (born 1993), American racing driver
Jesse Levine (born 1987), US/Canadian tennis player
Jon Levine (born 1963), American tennis player
 Nir Levine (born 1962), Israeli footballer and football manager
Tony Levine (born 1972), American football coach

In other fields
Samuel Levine (mobster)
Scott Levine, computer criminal
William P. Levine (1915-2013), United States Army major general and Holocaust speaker

See also
Arthur A. Levine Books, an American publisher owned by Scholastic
Lavine
Levene
Levi (disambiguation)
Levin (disambiguation)
Levy
Lewin (disambiguation)
Lieven
Justice Levine (disambiguation)

References

Jewish surnames
Levite surnames
Surnames of Russian origin
Yiddish-language surnames